Kellyville railway station is an elevated station on the Metro North West Line, as part of the Sydney Metro network. The station was built by Impregilo-Salini and Metro Trains Sydney for Transport for NSW, and is situated along Samantha Riley Drive, Kellyville, in Sydney, Australia. Kellyville Station opened on 26 May 2019.

History 

Kellyville, on Sydney's rural fringes, was not considered suitable for new suburban development until 1988, when then Planning Minister Bob Carr abandoned the state's long-standing policy of concentrating new development along existing rail corridors. Instead, the government green-lit development in the area on the proviso that a corridor be preserved for mass transit to be built in future. This corridor, which runs beside Old Windsor Road, was announced as the alignment for the North West T-way, a new bus rapid transit line 10 years later and construction began in 2004. Kellyville's three T-way stations – known as Riley, Burns and Balmoral – opened in March 2007, providing commuters with fast bus access from Kellyville to the Parramatta CBD. Commuters travelling to the Sydney CBD, however, needed to catch buses along the M2 Hills Motorway and congested Sydney Harbour Bridge.

Following dire warnings from the state's most senior rail bureaucrat about a looming capacity crunch on the rail system, a new "North West Rail Link" (NWRL) was proposed in 2005, featuring a station for Kellyville at the corner of Old Windsor and Burns roads – the site of the Burns T-way station, then under construction. A Burns Road Station remained government policy even when the NWRL was dumped in favour of the North West Metro proposal in 2008. The 2009 version of plan featured two stations, one at Burns Road, called Kellyville, and a second at Samantha Riley Drive.

Design and construction 

The Australian Labor Party was heavily defeated at the 2011 state election in part because of its tendency to announce, cancel and re-announce transport projects. The incoming Liberal/Nationals government, led by Barry O'Farrell, had put a promise to build the NWRL at the centre of their election platform. During consultation and detailed design, it was decided that Burns Road would be replaced with two stations: , on the edge of the giant Norwest Business Park, and Kellyville. Kellyville Station would be built on a new railway viaduct (dubbed the "skytrain") above the existing Riley T-way station.

As part of the project's public–private partnership delivery model, a consortium was chosen to operate the stations and trains. To ensure that the stations were designed to be maintainable and with customer service in mind, the operator would also be responsible for designing and building the station buildings. (An Italian joint venture, Impregilo-Salini, was chosen to build the viaduct as part of a separate $340 million contract.) The Metro Trains Sydney consortium, includes MTR Corporation, which designed, built and operates the stations on the Mass Transit Railway in Hong Kong.

Work on the new station began in June 2014. The NWRL was rebranded Sydney Metro Northwest the following year.

Services

Kellyville has two side platforms. It is served by Metro North West Line services. Kellyville station is served by a number of bus routes operated by Busways and Hillsbus.

References

External links
 Kellyville Station description at Sydney Metro Northwest project website
 Northwest Rapid Transit corporate website
 Kellyville Station details Transport for New South Wales  (Archived 14 June 2019)

Easy Access railway stations in Sydney
Railway stations in Australia opened in 2019
Sydney Metro stations
The Hills Shire